Watch House Village is a small village in County Wexford, Ireland, on the River Derry. It is a twin village of the much larger Clonegal in County Carlow on the other side of the river, which forms the county boundary.

See also
List of towns and villages in Ireland

External links
 Carlow County Council - 2007 Clonegal Draft Local Area Plan (refers to coordination between Wexford and Carlow county councils on development of Clonegal and Watch House village)

Towns and villages in County Wexford